Billy Terry is an author and CBC executive who lives in British Columbia, Canada.

He specializes in plant propagation and has lectured in the Capilano University Continuing Education program.

He is the author of "Blue Heaven: Encounters with the Blue Poppy" (2009),  "Beyond Beauty: Hunting the Wild Blue Poppy" (2012),  "Beauty by Design: Inspired Gardening in the Pacific Northwest" (2013, co-authored with his wife, Rosemary Bates), and "The Carefree Garden: Letting Nature Play her Part" (2015).

References and Links
 TouchWood Editions Accessed July 6, 2009
 My Blue Heaven
 Books For Everybody

References

Writers from British Columbia
Living people
Year of birth missing (living people)
Place of birth missing (living people)
Canadian garden writers
Canadian horticulturists
Floriculturists